Trnjani may refer to:

 Trnjani, Bosnia and Herzegovina, a village near Doboj
 Trnjani, Croatia, a village near Garčin

See also
 Trnjane (disambiguation), villages in Serbia
 Trnjaci (disambiguation), villages in Serbia and Bosnia